Thomas Wotton, 2nd Baron Wotton (1587 – 2 April 1630) was an English peer.

Wotton was the eldest son and heir of Edward Wotton, 1st Baron Wotton, and inherited his father's title in 1626. In 1608, he married Mary Throckmorton and they had three daughters:

Katherine (1609–1667), later created Countess of Chesterfield.
Hester (1615–1646), married Baptist Noel, 3rd Viscount Campden.
Anne (1629–), married Sir Edward Hales.

As he died without a male heir, Lord Wotton's title became extinct in 1630.

External links

2
1587 births
1630 deaths
People from Boughton Malherbe